Paul Huber (1910-5 February 1971) was a Swiss physicist. He was known for his works on nuclear physics.

Books
Das Problem Der Atomenergie
Introduction to Physics

References

1910 births
1971 deaths
Swiss physicists
Nuclear physicists